Elizabeth Chitty (born April 6, 1953) is an interdisciplinary artist known for performances, installations and constructed photographs as well as her writing.

Biography 
Elizabeth Chitty was born and raised in St. Catharines, Ontario.  Chitty has lived primarily in the Niagara Peninsula, except the period of time early in her career when she lived and worked in Vancouver and Toronto.

Career 
Elizabeth Chitty has created performance and video installation projects since the mid 1970s.  Her performance work over the course of her career has been defined in four phases: the first from 1975 to 1982, the second from 1983 to 1990, the third from 1992 to 1997, and the fourth being in the present; and was influenced by the context of what was occurring during these time periods.  In the 1970s and the 1980s her single-channel videos were widely exhibited, including venues such as the 11e Biennale de Paris in 1980 and the 1988 opening at the National Gallery of Canada.

Style, technique, and reception 
Chitty's passion for reconciliation between First Nations' and the settlers, has been reflected in her art practice since the 1990s.

In 2016 Chitty stated the following in reference to her art practice for the 11th 7a11d International Festival of Performance Art in Toronto, "I explore what it means to be in a body, a place, with others.  Interrelations of temporal-kinasthetic-visual-aural-textual interests flow through my body of work."  Chitty creates further definition in her work through ideas, emotions and sensations.

Significant works 
In November 2017 The Grass is Still Green won the 'Exhibit of the Year' at the Ontario Association of Art Galleries annual awards gala.  Her Video (Spring 1980): Canadian Video was exhibited at Museum of Modern Art, Manhattan in the spring of 1980.

Collections
In 1984 T.V.Love (1982) was purchased by the National Gallery of Canada. Demo Model (1978), Telling Tales (1979), Desire Control (1981) and Dogmachine (1981) video collection were deposited by Art Metropole, Toronto to the National Gallery of Canada in 1997.

References

Further reading 
 The Canadian Encyclopedia - Performance Art
 Elizabeth Chitty - The Artist reflects on her Niagara roots and the future of the fruit lands
 About... In a body, a place, at this time, with others

External links 
 Official website

1953 births
Living people
Artists from St. Catharines
Canadian installation artists
Canadian video artists
Women video artists
20th-century Canadian women artists
21st-century Canadian women artists